Long Live Père Ubu! is an album by the American band Pere Ubu, released in 2009. It is a soundtrack to a musical adaptation of the play from which the band took its name. The band performed its adaptation at (Le) Poisson Rouge. David Thomas referred to Long Live Père Ubu! as the first "true" punk album to be released in 30 years.

Sarah Jane Morris played the part of Ubu's wife.

Critical reception

The Independent wrote: "Reflecting the original play's deliberately repugnant manner, the accompaniment is full of martial, rat-a-tat drum fusillades and pompous marches, synth whines, washes of white noise and colossal bouts of belching, perfectly embodying the childish antagonism of Jarry's irrepressible urge to 'epater la bourgeoisie.'"

Record Collector called the album "a hall-of-mirrors audio play with a linear narrative, scronking, squalling rhythms and melodic snippets undulating round a pulsating soundscape."

Track listing
"Ubu Overture" - 2:42 
"Song of the Grocery Police" - 1:46  
"Banquet of the Butchers" - 2:55  
"March of Greed" - 3:34  
"Less Said the Better" - 2:31  
"Big Sombrero (Love Theme)" - 4:06  
"Bring Me the Head" - 3:39  
"Road to Reason" - 3:55  
"Slowly I Turn" - 4:25  
"Watching the Pigeons" - 3:21  
"The Story So Far" - 7:57  
"Snowy Livonia" - 1:20 
"Elsinore & Beyond" - 1:35

Personnel
Pere Ubu
David Thomas - vocals
Sarah Jane Morris - vocals
Keith Moliné - guitar, vocals
Michele Temple - bass, lead vocals
Steve Mehlman - drums, percussion, vocals

References

Pere Ubu albums
2009 albums